Bring Your Own Stereo is a studio album by Jimmie's Chicken Shack, released in 1999. 

It contains the single "Do Right", which peaked at No. 12 on the Billboard Modern Rock Tracks chart. The album peaked at No. 153 on the Billboard 200.

Production
Bring Your Own Stereo is a loose concept album about frontman Jimi Haha's ex-girlfriend. The album was produced by Jim Wirt; it was mixed by Tom Lord-Alge.

Critical reception
The Indianapolis Star called the album "an eclectic mix of slacker rock, ska, tame punk and acoustic pop with faux hip-hop grooves." The Charleston Daily Mail wrote: "Owing as much to '80s New Wave pop as to the band's usual blitz of guitar-heavy, slacker-ska, the Maryland quartet has turned down the crunch and aimed for loftier goals: Songs based on melody rather than guitar riffs."

Track listing 
All tracks by Jimi Haha

 "Spiraling" - 3:45
 "Lazy Boy Dash" - 3:13
 "Do Right" - 3:02
 "String Of Pearls" - 3:55
 "Ooh" - 3:04
 "Let's Get Flat" - 3:38
 "Trash" - 3:08
 "Fill In The Blank" - 3:20
 "Face It" - 3:20
 "Silence Again" - 2:59
 "Pure" - 4:29
 "Waiting" - 4:04
 "30 Days" - 3:57

Personnel 

 Greg Calbi – Mastering
 Randy Cole – Photography
 Double D – Fiddle
 Steve Ewing – Background vocals
 Stefanie Fife – Cello
 Jill Greenberg – Photography
 Jimi Haha – Fiddle, Art Direction
 Erin Haley – Project Coordinator
 Femio Hernández – Mixing Assistant
 Donat Kazarinoff – Tambourine, Background vocals, Engineer
 Che Colovita Lemon – Bass
 David Leonard – Mixing
 Chris Lord-Alge – Mixing
 Tom Lord-Alge – Mixing
 Declan Morrell – Project Coordinator
 Novi Novog – Viola
 Justin Risley – Assistant Engineer
 Matt Silva – Mixing Assistant
 Sipple – Snare drum
 P.J. Smith – Tambourine
 Jim Wirt – Producer, Engineer
 Kathleen Wirt – Project Coordinator
 Suzanne Ybarra – Project Coordinator

References 

Jimmie's Chicken Shack albums
1999 albums